Old Butt Knob is a summit in Haywood County, North Carolina, in the United States. It is located within Pisgah National Forest.

A hiking trail leads to Old Butt Knob's peak.

References

Mountains of Haywood County, North Carolina
Mountains of North Carolina